The 1986 African Cup of Nations was the 15th edition of the Africa Cup of Nations, a football championship of Africa (CAF). It was hosted by Egypt. Just like in 1984, the field of eight teams was split into two groups of four. Egypt won its third championship, beating Cameroon on penalty kicks 5–4 after a goalless draw.

Qualified teams 

The 8 qualified teams are:

 
  (holders)
 
  (hosts)

Squads

Venues 
The competition was played in two venues in Cairo and Alexandria.

First round

Group A

Group B

Knockout stage

Semifinals

Third place match

Final

Scorers 
4 goals
  Roger Milla

3 goals

  Taher Abouzaid
  Abdoulaye Traoré

2 goals

  André Kana-Biyik
  Louis-Paul M'Fédé
  Lucien Kassi-Kouadio

1 goal

  Rabah Madjer
  Karim Maroc
  Shawky Gharib
  Gamal Abdelhamid
  Kouassi N'Dri
  Oumar Ben Salah
  Abdelkrim Merry "Krimau"
  Abdelfettah Rhiati
  Mohammed Sahil
  Jules Bocandé
  Pape Fall
  Thierno Youm
  Kalusha Bwalya
  Michael Chabala

Own goal
  Jones Chilengi (against Morocco)

CAF Team of the Tournament

External links 
 Details at RSSSF

 
Nations Cup
International association football competitions hosted by Egypt
African Cup Of Nations, 1986
Africa Cup of Nations tournaments
African Cup of Nations
African Cup of Nations